Doris Turner is an American politician who has served as a member of the Illinois Senate from the 48th district since February 6, 2021. The 48th district, located in the Springfield metropolitan area and partially in the Metro East, includes all or parts of Christian, Macon, Macoupin, Madison, Montgomery, and Sangamon counties.

Early life, education, and career
Turner is a lifelong resident of Springfield, Illinois. She worked for the state of Illinois for 33 years. She worked for the Illinois Department of Public Health for 22 years. She was previously a member of the Springfield City Council and the Sangamon County Board. She was a member of the Springfield/Sangamon County Health Initiative Board of Directors. She is a founding member of the Southern Illinois University Federally Qualified Health Center.

Illinois Senate
Turner was appointed to the Senate after the previous Senator, Andy Manar, resigned his seat to work as a senior advisor for the J.B. Pritzker administration. As of July 2022, Senator Turner is a member of the following Illinois Senate committees:

 Agriculture Committee (SAGR)
 Appropriations - Health Committee (SAPP-SAHA)
 Redistricting - East Central & Southeast Illinois Committee (SRED-SRSE)
 Redistricting - Southwestern Illinois Committee (SRED-SRSW)
 Redistricting - West Central Illinois Committee (SRED-SRWC)
 State Government Committee (SGOA)
 Tourism and Hospitality Committee (STOU)
 Veterans Affairs Committee (SVET)

Turner is running for re-election in 2022 to the Illinois 48th Senate District.

Personal life
Turner currently resides in Springfield, Illinois. She and her husband Cecil have three children, ten grandchildren, and five great-grandchildren. She is a member of Grace United Methodist Church and worships at Greater All Nations Tabernacle Church of God in Christ.

References

External links
Senator Doris Turner (D) at the Illinois General Assembly
Constituent Website

21st-century American politicians
21st-century American women politicians
African-American Methodists
African-American state legislators in Illinois
African-American women in politics
Democratic Party Illinois state senators
Living people
People from Springfield, Illinois
Women state legislators in Illinois
Year of birth missing (living people)
21st-century African-American women
21st-century African-American politicians